The 2000 Gloucester City Council election took place on 5 May 2000 to elect members of Gloucester City Council in England. The council elected a third of the council and was controlled by the Labour Party.

Results  

|}

Ward results

Abbeymead

Barnwood

Barton

Eastgate

Hucclecote

Kingsholm

Linden

Longlevens

Matson

Podsmead

Tuffley

Westgate

References

2000 English local elections
2000
2000s in Gloucestershire